Countries by percentage of population living in poverty, as recorded by World Bank and other sources.

Methodology 
"Poverty" is defined as an economic condition by the lack of both money and basic necessities needed to live successfully, such as food, water, utilities, and housing. There are many working definitions of "poverty", with considerable debate on the most accurate definition of the term.

Lack of income security, economic stability and the predictability of one's continued means to meet basic needs all serve as absolute indicators of poverty. Poverty may therefore also be defined as the economic condition of lacking predictable and stable means of meeting basic life needs.

The first table lists countries by the percentage of their population with an income of less than $1.90 (the extreme poverty line), $3.20 and $5.50 US dollars a day in 2011 international (PPP) prices. The data is from the most recent year available from the World Bank API.

The second table lists countries by the percentage of the population living below the national poverty line—the poverty line deemed appropriate for a country by its authorities. National estimates are based on population-weighted subgroup estimates from household surveys.

Definitions of the poverty line vary considerably among nations. For example, rich nations generally employ more generous standards of poverty than poor nations. Even among rich nations, the standards differ greatly. Thus, the numbers are not comparable among countries. Even when nations do use the same method, some issues may remain.

Only countries for which sourced data is available are listed. Data for some countries, including Libya and Saudi Arabia, remains unavailable. It is usually accepted that over one third (33.3%) of the population in Libya and Saudi Arabia live below the poverty line.

Percent of population living on less than $1.90, $3.20 and $5.50 a day 
Percent of population (including non-citizens) living on less than $1.90, $3.20, and $5.50 a day, international (PPP) dollars as per the World Bank, the World Poverty Clock, and the Our World in Data

Percent of population living below national poverty line 
The percentage of the population living below national poverty line (%) – poverty line deemed appropriate for a country by its authorities (however definitions of the poverty line vary considerably among nations).

See also
 List of countries by Human Development Index
 List of countries by share of income of the richest one percent 
 List of countries by Official Development Assistance received
Economic inequality
Income disparity
International inequality

References

External links
Global Distribution of Poverty Global poverty datasets and map collection
Population below poverty line: Countries Compared

Poverty, percentage
Measurements and definitions of poverty

ru:Список стран по показателям неравенства доходов